Alejandro Alonso may refer to:
Alejandro Alonso (field hockey) (born 1999), Spanish field hockey player
Alejandro Alonso (footballer) (born 1982), Argentinian football player
Alejandro Alonso (musician) (born 1952), Latin-American musician
Alejandro Alonso Núñez (born 1951), Spanish politician